The Partnership for Excellence (formerly the Ohio Partnership for Excellence) is a nonprofit organization that administers a state-level award program for performance excellence in Ohio, Indiana, and West Virginia. The award is based on the Baldrige Criteria for Performance Excellence, which are developed and maintained by the Baldrige Performance Excellence Program, a program of the National Institute of Standards and Technology (NIST).


History
The Ohio Partnership for Excellence was incorporated as a 501c(3) nonprofit organization in 1998 to provide state level Baldrige assessment services and resources for interested organizations. In 2011, it was renamed The Partnership for Excellence (TPE) to reflect regional expansion that includes the states of Indiana and West Virginia.

The first award cycle was completed in 1999-2000.

The first Executive Director of the Ohio Partnership for Excellence was Tom Casperson (1998 – 2001), followed by Michael DiMonte (2001), Casey Mackert (2003 – 2006), Boris Slogar (2007 – 2008), and Dr. Elaine Edgar (2008 – 2011). 

In 2011, Colonel Alfred C. Faber, Jr. was appointed to the position of President/CEO of The Partnership for Excellence. Dr. Margot Hoffman took on the role of President/CEO in 2014.

Relationship with the Baldrige Community
TPE is a member of the Alliance for Performance Excellence – a national network of state and local Baldrige-based awards programs.
TPE Awards are based on the most recent Criteria for Performance Excellence – updated by the Baldrige Performance Excellence Program every two years.
Starting in 2012, unless certain conditions are met, organizations from Ohio, Indiana, and West Virginia are eligible to apply for the Malcolm Baldrige National Quality Award only if they have been awarded TPE's Governor's Award of Excellence in the previous five years.

Membership
TPE is a membership organization composed of interested individuals and organizations throughout Ohio, Indiana, and West Virginia. TPE collects annual membership dues for the January to December membership year.

Board of Examiners
TPE's Board of Examiners is composed of volunteer individuals who successfully complete annual training on the Baldrige Criteria for Performance Excellence. Advisors and examiners used during the awards process are drawn from the Board of Examiners.

Product/Service
TPE’s main product is a feedback report to the partnering organizations that successfully complete the award process. The report contains strengths as well as opportunities for improvement (OFI) derived from both the submitted application and a site visit. This is a distinct difference from the national Baldrige Award process where only organizations with highly graded applications are granted a site visit.

TPE also provides Baldrige-related educational services such as conferences, seminars, and direct partnering with individuals and organizations.

TPE Awards Process
TPE provides three options for organizations wanting to improve their organizational performance:

Advising
This is the level for organizations that are new to the Baldrige program and just getting started. A professional coach works with the organization to further explain the Baldrige Excellence Framework and develop a 5-page Organizational Profile. Once completed, TPE Examiners provide a feedback report, which includes a list of strengths and opportunities for improvement. Successful completion of the Advising level results in the “Spirit” award recognition at TPE’s annual Quest for Success Conference.

Partnering
This is Part II of the Advising & Partnering program. The professional coach reviews the feedback for the Organizational Profile and assists the organization in interpreting the feedback including linking the Organizational Profile to the process categories and aligning to the Baldrige Criteria, and developing a timeline for the organization to develop a 25-page application addressing the Baldrige Excellence Builder criteria. The Partnering phase focuses on processes, systems, and associated results. After review of this application, TPE Examiners provide a feedback report, which includes a list of strengths and opportunities for improvement. Successful completion of the Partnering level results in the “Pioneer” award recognition at TPE’s Quest for Success Conference.

Examining 
This is the traditional 50-page application assessment mirroring the Malcolm Baldrige National Quality Award's assessment cycle. Organizations participating in this option submit an Intent to Apply in August before the application due date in December each year. TPE assigns a team of 6-8 members from the Board of Examiners to review (independently and then by consensus) the application before a 3-day site visit is conducted. TPE then provides the organization with a feedback report, which includes a list of strength and opportunities for improvement. Based on the recommendations of the examiners team, TPE's Board of Trustees recognizes each organization with a Bronze, Silver, Gold, or Platinum Award at the annual Quest for Success conference.
Platinum Level - Also called the Governor's Award for Excellence
Gold Level - Also called the Achievement of Excellence Award
Silver Level - Also called the Commitment to Excellence Award
Bronze Level - Also called the Pledge to Excellence Award
Category Lead Performer Award
In 2007, TPE also recognized two organizations with the Executive Director's Special Distinction award.

Past Platinum Level - Governor's Award for Excellence Award Recipients 
Note:
The Partnership for Excellence does not necessarily recognize an organization at the Platinum level every year. Awards may have been given at the Gold, Silver, or Bronze Levels only (not listed here).

External links
official website
The Alliance for Performance Excellence
Baldrige Performance Excellence Program

See also
Malcolm Baldrige National Quality Award

References

Quality
Business and industry awards